Speakers Bank is a large coral atoll structure in the Northwestern part of the Chagos Archipelago. The total area is 582 km2, most of which is water. Most of the rim of the reef is between 5.5 and 14.5 metres below water. In the south, near the southwest edge, there are some coral heads at 05°04'S, 072°16'E, 0.5 metres of which are dry during low tide, and over which the sea breaks heavily during the southeast trade winds. In the Northeast, at 04°47'S, 072°26'E, there are a number of drying cays, the biggest of which, Big Speaker Reef, just reaches the high water mark. The land area is negligible.

Speakers Bank was surveyed in 1856 by British captain J. Speaker on HMS Wallerup. It is the site of many wrecks, also from prior times.

References

External links
Indian Ocean Pilot
Geochronology of Basement Rocks from the Mascarene Plateau, the Chagos Bank and the Maldives Ridge

Atolls of the Chagos Archipelago